The women's 200 metres event at the 1999 Pan American Games was held July 27–28.

Medalists

Results

Heats
Qualification: First 3 of each heat (Q) and the next 2 fastest (q) qualified for the final.

Wind:Heat 1: +1.3 m/s, Heat 2: +0.7 m/s

Final
Wind: -1.3 m/s

References

Athletics at the 1999 Pan American Games
1999
1999 in women's athletics